La Celle-Guenand is a commune in the Indre-et-Loire department in central France.

Population

See also
Château de La Celle-Guenand
Communes of the Indre-et-Loire department

References

External links
 Official website of La Celle-Guenand (fr)

Communes of Indre-et-Loire